Trinidad and Tobago competed in the 2015 Pan American Games in Toronto, Canada from July 10 to 26, 2015.

Sport shooter Roger Daniel was the flagbearer for the team during the opening ceremony.

Competitors
The following table lists Trinidad and Tobago's delegation per sport and gender.

Medalists

Athletics

Trinidad and Tobago qualified 32 athletes (17 men and 15 women). Lalonde Gordon, Jessica James, Lisa Wickham and Peli Alzola were named to the team as part of the relay events, but did not compete.

Key
Note–Ranks given for track events are for the entire round
Q = Qualified for the next round
q = Qualified for the next round as a fastest loser or, in field events, by position without achieving the qualifying target
NR = National record
GR = Games record
PB = Personal best
DNF = Did not finish
NM = No mark
N/A = Round not applicable for the event
Bye = Athlete not required to compete in round

Men
Track events

Athletes who raced in the semifinal only and received a medal.

Field events

Women
Track events

Field events

Badminton

Trinidad and Tobago qualified a team of two athletes (one man and one woman). Trinidad and Tobago received an additional female quota after quotas were declined, but later rejected both female quotas.

Men

Beach volleyball

Trinidad and Tobago qualified a men's and women's pair for a total of four athletes.

Men's

Boxing

Trinidad and Tobago qualified one female boxer.

Women

Cycling

Trinidad and Tobago qualified five cyclists (one in road and four in track).

Road
Men

Track
Sprint

Keirin

Omnium

Field hockey

Trinidad and Tobago qualified a men's team of 16 athletes.

Men's tournament 

Roster

Pool A

Quarterfinals

Classification round
Semifinals

Seventh place match

Football

Trinidad and Tobago qualified a men's and women's teams for a total of 36 athletes (18 male and 18 female).

Men's tournament

Roster
The roster for Trinidad and Tobago was as follows.

Group B

Women's tournament 

Roster

Head coach: Ross Rusel

Group A

Golf

Trinidad and Tobago qualified a full team of four golfers.

Gymnastics

Artistic
Trinidad and Tobago qualified 2 gymnasts.

Men
Individual Qualification

Qualification Legend: Q = Qualified to apparatus final

Women

Qualification Legend: Q = Qualified to apparatus final

Judo

Trinidad and Tobago qualified a one male judoka.

Men

Sailing

Trinidad and Tobago qualified 2 boats.

Shooting

Trinidad and Tobago qualified three male shooter.

Men

Swimming

Trinidad and Tobago qualified three male swimmers.

Men

Taekwondo

Trinidad and Tobago qualified one male taekwondo practitioner.

See also
Trinidad and Tobago at the 2016 Summer Olympics

References

Nations at the 2015 Pan American Games
P
2015